HMS Diomede was a 44-gun fifth rate built by James Martin Hillhouse and launched at Bristol on 18 October 1781. As a two-decker, she had two complete batteries of guns, one on the upper deck and the other on the lower deck.

Diomede participated in two major actions. The first occurred in 1782 when she captured South Carolina of the South Carolina Navy. The second took place in 1794 in the Indian Ocean. Although the action in the Indian Ocean was inconclusive and the French broke off contact after suffering much heavier casualties than the British, the French did succeed in breaking the blockade of Île de France and saved it from starvation.

Diomede was wrecked in 1795 off Trincomalee, Ceylon, during the campaign to capture Trincomalé.

Career
In October 1781 Diomede was commissioned under Captain Thomas L. Frederick. On 8 June 1782 he sailed her for North America.

Capture of South Carolina

South Carolina, under Captain John Joyner, was attempting to dash out of Philadelphia, Pennsylvania, through the British blockade. She was in the company of the brig Constance, schooner Seagrove and the ship Hope, which had joined her for protection.

The British chased South Carolina for 18 hours and fired on her for two hours before she struck. She had a crew of about 466 men when captured, of whom she had lost six killed or wounded. The British suffered no casualties.

Astraea and Quebec also captured Hope and Constance, which was carrying tobacco. Prize crews then took South Carolina, Hope, and Constance to New York. Seagrove escaped.  Prize money was paid in 1784.

Diomede was paid off in December 1783, after the end of the war. She was recommissioned in March 1793 under Captain Matthew Smith. On 17 November 1793, Smith sailed Diomede for the East Indies.

Action of 22 October 1794
A year later Diomede was with the British 50-gun ship , Captain Samuel Osborne, in a blockade of Île de France. She took part in the action of 22 October 1794 when the senior French naval officer there, Commodore Jean-Marie Renaud, decided to try to break the blockade.

Malacca station 
They were to stay there until all the trade from the eastward had passed. Diomede was then to return to Madras via the Sunda Straits and Heroine via the Strait of Malacca.

Fate

On 2 August 1795 Diomede was towing a transport brig when she struck a sunken rock in Black Bay and sank. She was working into the bay against a strong land wind when she hit the rock, which her charts showed as being a half-mile further north. She went down with all her stores on board and there was barely enough time for her crew to save themselves.

Although the loss of Diomede delayed the landing by a day, on 31 August the British captured Fort Ostenburg, and with it Trincomalee. The British would go on to capture other Dutch settlements in India and Ceylon, but denying Trincomalee to the French was the most important objective.

Post script
In his report on the action of 22 October 1794, Osborne wrote critically of Smith's conduct. Smith asked Osborne for an explanation. Osborne replied even more critically and demanded a court martial to examine Smith's command of the two frigates. The resulting court martial dismissed Smith from the Navy. The issue was not a lack of courage but rather Smith's dislike and jealousy of Osborne. When Smith returned to Britain in 1798 he appealed the sentence. His dismissal was rescinded due to irregularities in the proceedings and he was restored to his rank. However, the Admiralty never again called him into service.

Citations

References

 
 
 James, William (1837) The Naval History of Great Britain from the Declaration of War by France in 1793, to the Accession of George IV. (London: Richard Bentley), Vol. 1.
 
 
 
 

 

1781 ships
Ships of the Royal Navy
Maritime incidents in 1795